Sir Charles Arnold White (1858 – 6 September 1931) was a British lawyer who served as the Advocate-General of Madras Presidency from 1898 to 1899 and as Chief Justice of the Madras High Court from 1899 to 1914.

Early life and education 

White was born in 1858 to Thomas John White of Bowdon, Cheshire and educated at New College, Oxford from where he completed his graduation in 1881. White was called to the bar in 1883.

Career 

White served as the Advocate-General of the Madras Presidency and ex-officio member of the Madras Legislative Council from 1898 to 1899. He resigned in 1899 following his appointment as Chief Justice of the Madras High Court. In 1914, White was appointed to the Council of India. He also served as the Vice Chancellor of the University of Madras.

Honours 

White was made a Knight Bachelor in 1900.

References 

 

1858 births
Year of death missing
Knights Bachelor
Advocates General for Tamil Nadu
Chief Justices of the Madras High Court
Vice Chancellors of the University of Madras
British India judges
Alumni of New College, Oxford
Members of the Madras Legislative Council
English barristers